Minasnioc (Spanish minas mines, Quechua -ni, -yuq  suffixes, "the one with mines") is a mountain in the north of the Chila mountain range in the Andes of Peru, about  high. It is situated in the Arequipa Region, Caylloma Province, on the border of the districts Caylloma and Tapay. It lies north of Surihuiri and Minaspata and northeast of the mountain named Huaillaccocha and Huallatane.

References 

Mountains of Peru
Mountains of Arequipa Region